The 1939 NC State Wolfpack football team was an American football team that represented North Carolina State University as a member of the Southern Conference (SoCon) during the 1939 college football season. In its third season under head coach Williams Newton, the team compiled a 2–8 record (2–4 against SoCon opponents) and was outscored by a total of 191 to 49.

Schedule

References

NC State
NC State Wolfpack football seasons
NC State Wolfpack football